Ulf Adam Mustonen Gilljam (born 8 July 1990) is a Swedish professional bandy player.

Career

Club career
Gilljam is a youth product of Broberg and played for their senior team until 2012, when he joined Hammarby.

In 2014, he was named "Årets komet" ("Comet of the year") in Swedish bandy.

International career
Gilljam was part of Swedish World Champions teams of 2017.  He made a significant contribution when he scored the decisive goal in the 91st minute in the final against Russia.

Honours

Country
 Sweden
 Bandy World Championship: 2017

References

External links
 
 

1990 births
Living people
Swedish bandy players
Broberg/Söderhamn Bandy players
Hammarby IF Bandy players
Place of birth missing (living people)
Sweden international bandy players
Bandy World Championship-winning players
Yenisey Krasnoyarsk players
Swedish people of Belgian descent